Sclerolaena  is a genus of annuals or short-lived perennials in the family Chenopodiaceae (sensu stricto), which are included in Amaranthaceae (sensu lato) according to the APG classification.

Species include:
Sclerolaena alata Paul G. Wilson
Sclerolaena anisacanthoides Domin
Sclerolaena bicornis Lindl.
Sclerolaena birchii (F. Muell.) Domin
Sclerolaena blakei (Ising) A.J. Scott
Sclerolaena calcarata (Ising) A.J.Scott
Sclerolaena cuneata Paul G. Wilson
Sclerolaena densiflora 
Sclerolaena diacantha (Nees) Benth.
Sclerolaena divaricata (R.Br.) Sm.
Sclerolaena eriacantha (F. Muell.) Ulbr.
Sclerolaena eurotioides (F. Muell.) A.J. Scott
Sclerolaena fimbriolata (F. Muell.) A.J. Scott
Sclerolaena forrestiana (F. Muell.) Domin
Sclerolaena fusiformis Paul G. Wilson
Sclerolaena hostilis (Diels) Domin
Sclerolaena lanicuspis (F.Muell.) F.Muell. ex Benth.
Sclerolaena medicaginoides Paul G. Wilson
Sclerolaena muricata (Moq.) Domin
Sclerolaena napiformis Paul G. Wilson
Sclerolaena parviflora 
Sclerolaena × ramsayae (J.H.Willis) A.J.Scott
Sclerolaena tetracuspis (C.T.White) A.J.Scott
Sclerolaena tetragona Paul G. Wilson
Sclerolaena tricuspis (F.Muell.) Ulbr.
Sclerolaena tridens (F. Muell.) Domin
Sclerolaena uniflora R.Br.

References

External links

 
Amaranthaceae
Amaranthaceae genera
Caryophyllales of Australia